The men's 1500 metre freestyle event at the 1988 Summer Olympics took place on 23 September at the Jamsil Indoor Swimming Pool in Seoul, South Korea.

Records
Prior to this competition, the existing world and Olympic records were as follows.

Results

Heats
Rule: The eight fastest swimmers advance to final A (Q).

Final

References

External links
 Official Report
 USA Swimming
 Results on Olympedia.org

Swimming at the 1988 Summer Olympics
Men's events at the 1988 Summer Olympics